Nathaniel Bacon School  is a historic school building located in Richmond, Virginia.  The structure was built in 1914 based on a design by Charles M. Robinson, supervising architect, and William L. Carneal, architect.  The Colonial Revival building is a -story brick structure located in Richmond's Oakwood/Chimborazo Historic District.  The school was "a focal point of the Chimborazo neighborhood."  The school was named for Nathaniel Bacon, the leader of Bacon's Rebellion.  It served as an elementary school in the Richmond Public Schools from the time of its opening in 1915.  In 1958, it was converted for use as a school for African-American students.  In 1971, it was converted into a junior high school and renamed the East End Junior High School Annex.  The building ceased operating as a school in the 1980s.  It was listed on the National Register of Historic Places in 1992.

References

National Register of Historic Places in Richmond, Virginia
Colonial Revival architecture in Virginia
School buildings completed in 1914
Schools in Richmond, Virginia
School buildings on the National Register of Historic Places in Virginia
1914 establishments in Virginia